Jackson Township is a subdivision of Ste. Genevieve County, Missouri, in the United States of America, and is one of the five townships located in Ste. Genevieve County.

Name
The township was named for the President Andrew Jackson who became president the year that the township was founded.

History
Jackson Township was created in 1827 from the northern portion of Ste. Genevieve Township.

Populated places
There are several communities in Jackson Township.  The only incorporated community, Bloomsdale, has a population of 521.

Bloomsdale
Kinsey
Needlemore
Valley View

The township also contains three churches: Saint Lawrence's Catholic Church, and Lebanon Church, as well as the following cemeteries: Beckemeyer, Bequette, Bockenhamp, Concord, Hoover, and Moeller.

Geography
Jackson Township is located in the northern portion of Ste. Genevieve County.
A number of streams run through the township: Carpenter Branch, Coots Creek, Cunningham Branch, Fourche a du Clos, Goose Creek, Isle du Bois Creek, Kinsey Creek, and Pin Hook Branch.  The following lakes are found in the township: Corbin Lake, Werners Sunset Lake, Sunset Lake, and Pinkston Lake.

2000 census
The 2000 census shows Jackson Township consisting of 3,337 individuals.  The racial makeup of the town was 98.6% White, 0.0% African American, 0.2% Native American and Alaska Native, 0.0% Asian, and 0.08% from two or more races.

2010 census
As of the census of 2010, there were 3,616 people, with a population density of 34 per square mile (68.6 km2), residing in the township. Males make up 1,686 (50.5%) of the population, while females make up 1,651 (49.5%).  The median age for men is 35.7 years and for women is 35.4.

The racial makeup of the town was 98.3% White, 0.0% African American, 0.2% Native American and Alaska Native, 0.1% Asian, and 0.22% from other races, and 0.8% from two or more races.

The average household size 2.72 persons.  The estimated median household income in 2009 was $45.556 ($38,209 in 1999). 11.0% of the residents have an income below the poverty rate.

GNIS reference
The Geographic Names Information System lists 32 townships named Jackson in various counties of Missouri.

References

Geography of Ste. Genevieve County, Missouri
Townships in Missouri